Schlüsselberg Castle was a high medieval, aristocratic castle in the Franconian region of Germany. Its ruins lie on a hill above the Pulvermühle, a southern town quarter of Waischenfeld in the Upper Franconian county of Bayreuth in Bavaria.

The burgstall of the castle is freely accessible.

Location 
The castle site is located within the Franconian Switzerland-Veldenstein Forest Nature Park on the Schlüsselberg, a hill also called the Galgenberg ("gallows hill"), in the valley of the Wiesent. The rocky spur on which the castle stood had the shape of a key (Schlüssel), so perhaps the castle was named after the local landmark.

The easiest way to reach the old castle is from the eastern side of the Galgenberg. There, near a monument on the edge of the wood, a path enters the trees. Visitors should follow the path until they reach a sharp curve. This is in the neck ditch of the castle.

In the vicinity of Schlüsselberg are other castles and ruins. To the north are the ruins of Waischenfeld Castle with its tower, the Steinerner Beutel and the former Schloss Gutenbiegen near the eponymous village; to the southeast are Rabenstein Castle and the burgställe of Wal zum hohen Loch and Alte Veste. Further down the Wiesent valley stands Rabeneck Castle. Directly opposite the Galgenberg on the Kreuzberg was another, probably prehistorical, fortification.

Literature 
 Rüdiger Bauriedel, Ruprecht Konrad-Röder: Mittelalterliche Befestigungen und niederadelige Ansitze im Landkreis Bayreuth. Ellwanger Druck und Verlag, Bayreuth, 2007, p. 151.
 Gustav Voit u.a.: Vom Land im Gebirg zur Fränkischen Schweiz. Eine Landschaft wird entdeckt. Verlag Palm & Enke, Erlangen, 1992,  (Die Fränkische Schweiz; 8).
 Hellmut Kunstmann: Die Burgen der östlichen Fränkischen Schweiz. Kommissionsverlag Ferdinand Schöningh, Würzburg, 1965, pp. 83–89.

External links 
 Auszug aus der Arbeit Gustav Voits

Hill castles
Castles in Bavaria
Franconian Switzerland